Mohamed El-Oulabi (born 3 May 1951) is a Syrian wrestler. He competed in two events at the 1980 Summer Olympics.

References

1951 births
Living people
Syrian male sport wrestlers
Olympic wrestlers of Syria
Wrestlers at the 1980 Summer Olympics
Place of birth missing (living people)